Ballinasloe GAA (Irish: CLG Bhéal Átha na Sluaighe) is a Gaelic Athletic Association Gaelic football and hurling club located in Ballinasloe, County Galway, Ireland.

Club history
It was formed on 1 December 2005 as the result of a merger of St Grellan's GFC and Ballinasloe Hurling Club.
Ballinasloe’s first ever hurling game took place on The Fair Green on Easter Monday 1884 between Killimor and Eyrecourt. Since this date Gaelic Games have been a pillar in Ballinasloe’s society. Since the games’ inception its popularity in Ballinasloe has been integral to its success. The first football game in Ballinasloe GAA’s successful history took place on 31 March 1893 in a field in Pollboy. The game was between Creagh and Ballinasloe. Ballinasloe was captained by Thomas Cunningham and Creagh by T.F Burke. Creagh came out on top in a low scoring game of 2-01 to 1 point.

Late that year in June 1893, Ballinasloe fulfilled another fixture where they were welcomed out to Kiltormer to take on Killoran in a gaelic football game under GAA rules.

Ballinasloe's association with Gaelic games can be traced back beyond an inaugural meeting of the GAA which was held in Thurles on 1 November 1884; on an earlier date in 1884, Killimor and the Dublin Metropolitan Hurling team played a hurling challenge in Ballinasloe and included in that Dublin team was Michael Cusack who later in the same year, was to be a founder member of the association. In 1889, Ballinasloe had a football club with J.F. Gibney as captain. Despite the Parnell crisis, the Galway Football Championship for 1891 was played and Ballinasloe participated, playing Mountbellew in Ahascragh on 24 May of that year. In 1892, P.D. Brennan of Ballinasloe became Assistant County Secretary.

Up to 1913 the Ballinasloe club had not enjoyed success on the field of play. Between 1887 and 1912, Tuam won twelve County Titles, Dunmore won eight, other winners being Loughrea and Athenry while Ballinasloe was without a title.

In 1931, Joe Kelleher led Galway to All Ireland victory in the Junior Championship.

Ballinasloe GAA has enjoyed continued success at all levels in both hurling and football. It has seen many of its members see the maroon and white of Galway. It continues to participate at a high level and with the amalgamation of hurling and football codes, development of their new facilities and recent announcement of further development in 2014, will surely continue to enjoy success far into the future.

Achievements
All-Ireland Junior Club Football Championship Winners 2013
Connacht Junior Club Football Championship Winners 2012
Galway Junior Football Championship Winners 2012

References

External links
Official Ballinasloe GAA Club website

Ballinasloe
Gaelic football clubs in County Galway
Hurling clubs in County Galway
Gaelic games clubs in County Galway